Serikovo is a rural locality (a selo) and the administrative center of Serikovskoye Rural Settlement, Buturlinovsky District, Voronezh Oblast, Russia. The population was 435 as of 2010. There are 6 streets.

Geography 
Serikovo is located 33 km northeast of Buturlinovka (the district's administrative centre) by road. Makogonovo is the nearest rural locality.

References 

Rural localities in Buturlinovsky District